Baghi may refer to:

Films
 Baghi (1939 film), see List of Hindi films of 1939
 Baghi (1953 film), see List of Hindi films of 1953
 Baghi (1956 film), a Pakistani Urdu-language film
 Baghi (1964 film), a 1964 Bollywood film with Leela Naidu
 Baghi (2005 film), a 2005 film with Sardool Sikander

Other uses
 Baghi, Iran, a village in North Khorasan Province, Iran
 Baghi, Razavi Khorasan, a village in Razavi Khorasan Province, Iran
 Emadeddin Baghi (born 1962), Iranian rights activist and investigative journalist

See also 
 Baghi Sipahi (disambiguation)
 Baaghi (disambiguation)
 Bagi (disambiguation)